Mohamed Musthaq (born 16 December 1998) is a Sri-Lankan footballer who plays as a midfielder for Up Country Lions SC of the Sri Lanka Champions League, and the Sri Lanka national football team.

Club career
Mustaq played for Young Star SC from 2018 to 2020. He then joined Up Country Lions SC of the Sri Lanka Champions League.

International career
Musthaq represented Sri Lanka at the youth level, making three appearances for his nation during 2020 AFC U-23 Championship qualification. He was called up to the senior national team for the first time in July 2018 for a pair of friendlies against Lithuania. He eventually made his senior debut on 31 August 2019 in a 1–5 friendly defeat to the United Arab Emirates. He scored his team's only goal in the match, his first for Sri Lanka. In 2021 he was called up to the senior squad again for 2022 FIFA World Cup qualification and the SAFF Championship.

International goals
Scores and results list Sri Lanka's goal tally first.

International career statistics

References

External links

AFC Stats archive

1998 births
Living people
Sri Lankan footballers
Association football midfielders
Sri Lanka international footballers